The Association des Sports de Glisse d'Angers is a French ice hockey team based in Angers playing in the Ligue Magnus. The team currently use the name of "Les Ducs d'Angers". The team's mascot is an eagle-owl, or grand duc (literally great duke) in French, but its name is primarily intended as a reference to the prestigious Dukes of Anjou lineage.

The team was founded in 1982 and plays home games at the Angers IceParc.

The Team has never been French champion, but won the French cup in 2007 and 2014.

History

2009/2010
Saturday, April 3, 2010 - Angers defeated the Briançon Red Devils on the road, 3 games out of 2, in the Best of 5 game semifinal series. Angers reached the Magnus League Championship for the first time in team history.

Angers and Rouen set to face each other in the Finals. Angers had a chance at redemption after losing at Rouen 7-0 in the Quarterfinals of the French Cup, on Tuesday, January 5, 2010.

Monday, April 6, 2010 - (Game 1 @ Rouen) Angers, on the road, won at Rouen 2-1.

Tuesday, April 7, 2010 - (Game 2 @ Rouen) Angers took a 2-0 lead in the 2nd Period of the game. Rouen started the 3rd Period with a quick goal to bring them within one. Angers quickly responded and scored again, putting themselves up 3-1. And desperation set in for Rouen as they too responded quickly scoring, making it 3-2 Angers. Angers responded several minutes later making it 4-2. Angers never looked back from there. 4-2 final score.

Friday, April 9, 2010 - (Game 3 @ Angers) Les Ducs looked tired and were down 3-0. They battled back and made it 3-2 but would eventually fall 4-2.

Saturday, April 10, 2010 - (Game 4 @ Angers) Angers did not show up to this match and lost their second and final chance to win the cup at home by a 6-1 margin.

Tuesday, April 13, 2010 - (Game 5 @ Rouen) It was 1-1 after two periods of play. Rouen went on to score 3 more in the third period and Angers added one more. The Ducs ended their bid to be champions of France, failing to win it all with their three opportunities to bring the Cup home.

2010 Magnus League Quarterfinals (Best of 5 games)

 Game 1: Tuesday, March 16, 2010 @ Angers Ducs (Angers wins 6-2)
 Game 2: Wednesday, March 17, 2010 @ Angers Ducs (Angers wins 5-0)
 Game 3: Friday, March 19, 2010 @ HC Morzine-Avoriaz Penguins (Angers wins 4-0)

2010 Magnus League Semifinals (Best of 5 games)

 Game 1: Friday, March 26, 2010 @ Briançon Red Devils (Briançon wins 2-1)
 Game 2: Saturday, March 27, 2010 @ Briançon Red Devils (Angers wins 4-2)
 Game 3: Tuesday, March 30, 2010 @ Angers Ducs (Briançon wins 3-2)
 Game 4: Wednesday, March 31, 2010 @ Angers Ducs (Angers wins 3-2)
 Game 5: Saturday, April 3, 2010 @ Briançon Red Devils (Angers wins 4-2)

2010 Magnus League Finals (Best of 5 games)

 Game 1: Tuesday, April 6, 2010 @ Rouen Dragons (Angers wins 2-1)
 Game 2: Wednesday, April 7, 2010 @ Rouen Dragons (Angers wins 4-2)
 Game 3: Friday, April 9, 2010 @ Angers Ducs (Rouen wins 4-2)
 Game 4: Saturday, April 10, 2010 @ Angers Ducs (Rouen wins 6-1)
 Game 5: Tuesday, April 13, 2010 @ Rouen Dragons (Rouen wins 4-2)

2010/2011
The Ducs earned their second consecutive trip to the French Cup Final v. formidable foe Rouen; who ousted the Ducs in the 09-10 Magnus League Championship in three consecutive games. On January 30, 2011, the Ducs would travel to Bercy to face the Dragons. Rouen took an early lead going up 2-0 after 1 period of play. In the 2nd period, Rouen would add two more and Angers adding one. After 2 the score was 4-1. The Ducs mounted a comeback, scoring 3 unanswered goals in the 3rd period; however Angers once again fell victim to the Dragons in overtime, losing 5-4.

Roster 
Updated February 1, 2019.

|}

Notable former players
 Julien Albert
 Miguel Baldris
 Tomas Baluch
 Christophe Blanchet
 
 Andrew Finlay
 François Ferrari
 Stephane Gachet
 Rodolphe Garnier
 François Gravel
 Michael Irani
 Jean-Francois Jodoin
 Henrik Johansson
 Alexandre Kalisa
 Marko Kiprusoff (brother of NHL goaltender Miikka Kiprusoff)
 
 
 Todd Marcellus
 Juan-Jose Palacin
 Guillaume Rodrigue
 Joakim Skold
 Anders Sorensen
 Jeremy Tabb (University of Massachusetts Lowell/Elmira College)
 
 Florian Hardy

References

External links
  
  Ducs Supporters website

Ice hockey teams in France
Sport in Angers
Ice hockey clubs established in 1982
1982 establishments in France